Yeongdeok County (Yeongdeok-gun) is a county in North Gyeongsang Province, South Korea. It is well known for snow crabs.

Administrative divisions 

Yeongdeok County is divided into 1 eup and 8 myeon.

Festival
Yeongdeok city hosts a 'Snow Crab Festival' every year. The festival offers various events, including children snow crab fishing, family team game, snow crab auction, Madangguk (One type of traditional Korean performance). The Youngdeok King Festival, which marks its 21st year in 2018, is held in the Gaejang Port and offers a variety of attractions and experiences to tourists through its colorful events.

Climate
Yeongdeok has a cooler version of a humid subtropical climate (Köppen: Cfa).

References

External links

County government website

 
Counties of North Gyeongsang Province